Lewis Bedford may refer to:
 Lewis Bedford (footballer) (1899–1966), English footballer
 Lewis Bedford (cricketer) (born 1999), English cricketer